Live from Amsterdam is the first concert film and live album by American rock band Alter Bridge, recorded on December 7, 2008, at the Heineken Music Hall in Amsterdam, Netherlands and released to extremely positive reviews on September 12, 2009 via Amazon. A Blu-ray retail version, along with a deluxe box set, was delayed several times by Universal Republic, Alter Bridge's former record label, causing controversy and the band's eventual split from the label. It was finally released in stores in North America on January 11, 2011, almost two years after the originally planned release date, by DC3 Music Group and Alter Bridge Recordings.

Live from Amsterdam was directed and produced by Daniel Catullo from DC3 Music Group and Coming Home Productions, who has also worked with artists such as Nickelback, Godsmack, Marilyn Manson, Chickenfoot, Dave Matthews Band, and The Smashing Pumpkins.

Background
On October 3, 2008, Alter Bridge announced on their website that they would shoot a DVD of their concert on November 8, 2008 at the Brixton Academy in London during their 2007–2008 Blackbird tour. This was a notable concert as Led Zeppelin members Jimmy Page and John Paul Jones had been in attendance. However, due to scheduling conflicts, the DVD filming was postponed. The filming was rescheduled to December 7, 2008 at the Heineken Music Hall in Amsterdam. On January 1, 2009, the band announced that they would offer fans a preview of the DVD. Originally, a tentative release date had been set for February 2009 according to a statement made by Alter Bridge's press liaison. However, it was pushed back several times due to the extensive time it took to edit the DVD. In June 2009, a Myspace page for the DVD was launched. Live from Amsterdam was directed and produced by Daniel Catullo.

The DVD was finally sold at venues during Creed's 2009 reunion tour on September 12, 2009 and later released exclusively on Amazon.com on October 6, 2009 and became extremely successful. A Blu-ray Disc version was revealed to be released in stores, along with a deluxe edition, on September 29, 2009 on the DVD's Myspace page. However, one day before the projected release date, it was announced that it had been postponed again at the last minute due to issues between record labels. Singer Myles Kennedy issued an apology to the fans a few days later, explaining that this was out of the band's control and that the band was unhappy with the way the postponing of the release was handled. As announced on the DVD's Myspace page, the new release date was February 23, 2010, one full year since it was originally planned to be released, but several delays followed. Alter Bridge remained optimistic about its release, despite the members continually voicing their frustrations.

As announced on November 21, 2010, Live from Amsterdam aired on Palladia on December 19, 2010. The same announcement said that the deluxe edition of the DVD would be released in stores worldwide on January 11, 2011. On the same day, it was announced that it would be released in Europe "sometime in December." The message, which was posted on the DVD's Myspace page, also said, " We promise this time the release WILL happen!" It was finally released in stores in North America on January 11, 2011. Universal Republic and Wind-up Records, Alter Bridge's former record labels, have not given explanations for the delays.

Included on the DVD is a cover of "Travelling Riverside Blues" by Robert Johnson, as well as a tribute to The Beatles where singer Myles Kennedy performs the opening guitar part of The Beatles' song "Blackbird" as an intro to Alter Bridge's song of the same name.

Reception
The Amazon exclusive version of Live from Amsterdam was overwhelmingly successful, with very positive reviews from fans and critics. On October 22, 2010, it rose 15,000 spots on Amazon's "Bestsellers in Music Videos & Concerts" chart, rising ahead of artists such as Michael Jackson and Bon Jovi and in just eight hours reached #1, where it remained for several weeks. Amazon had reportedly expected to sell only few hundred copies, but instead, "thousands and thousands" of copies were sold. This is a notable feat as it was done entirely by word of mouth with no official promotion.

The Amazon exclusive version has received praise from several professional reviewers, including Paul Roy from Blogcritics who called it "spectacular." Another very positive review by The Audio Perv said, "You don't have to be an Alter Bridge fanatic to enjoy the truly mesmerizing performance on this DVD. Shot in several different angles, director Dan Catullo truly captures the band in far more than just a usual gig. You see and feel frontman Myles Kennedy not just singing at you the audience, but singing to you, the individual viewer." The reviewer also praised the production, praising it for being "not only visually appealing with all the high quality shots of the band and incredible stage show and lighting but also superb in sound."

It has received an average four and half stars on Amazon.

Track listing

CD

DVD

Personnel

Alter Bridge
 Myles Kennedy — lead vocals, rhythm and lead guitar
 Mark Tremonti — lead and rhythm guitar, back vocals
 Brian Marshall — bass
 Scott Phillips — drums
Additional musicians
 Ian Keith — rhythm guitar on "One Day Remains"

Production
 Daniel Catullo — director
 Lionel Pasamonte, Daniel Catullo, Peter Bowers, Michael Tremonti — producers
 Brian Lisi, Simon Thierer, Matthew King, Paul Geary, Steve Wood — executive producers
 Michael Romanyshyn — editing
 Brian Sperber — mixing
 Brian Gardner — mastering

References

External links
 
 
 Official Alter Bridge website
 Official DVD MySpace

Alter Bridge video albums
2009 video albums
Live video albums
2009 live albums